James Green (4 July 1879 – 1940) was an English footballer who played in the Football League for Preston North End.

References

1879 births
1940 deaths
English footballers
Association football forwards
English Football League players
Preston North End F.C. players
Chorley F.C. players